Paisley is a future neighbourhood in southwest Edmonton, Alberta, Canada. Subdivision and development of the neighbourhood will be guided by the Heritage Valley Neighbourhood 12 Neighbourhood Area Structure Plan (NASP) adopted by Edmonton City Council on August 29, 2011. The neighbourhood was officially named in 2012 after Brian Paisley, founder of the Edmonton International Fringe Festival.

Paisely is located within the Heritage Valley area and was the original Heritage Valley Neighbourhood 12 within Heritage Valley Servicing Concept Design Brief (SCDB).

Surrounding neighbourhoods

References 

Neighbourhoods in Edmonton